Malcolm Wood is a British-Chinese restaurateur. He is the co-founder, managing director, and culinary director of Maximal Concepts, a restaurant and hospitality group best known for its flagship restaurant brand, Mott 32. He has been involved in documentary films about environmental issues, including A Plastic Ocean and The Last Glaciers.

Early life and education 
Wood was born in Taipei, Taiwan and is of Chinese and English heritage. He spent his early years in Taiwan, but lived in multiple places throughout his childhood, including Hong Kong, India, Italy, Canada, and London. He attended university at the University of Bristol in England, and has earned degrees in finance and financial law.

Career 
While still in university, he met Matt Reid, and the two formed a business partnership in hospitality which has spanned 20 years. A few years later, they founded Maximal Concepts in 2011. They opened their first restaurant under the Maximal Concepts umbrella, Blue Butcher, that year in Hong Kong. Through Maximal Concepts in 2014, Wood co-founded Mott 32, a Cantonese restaurant also based in Hong Kong. The restaurant brand has since expanded with locations in Las Vegas, Seoul, Vancouver, and Singapore. As of 2020, the restaurant group has developed over 20 other brands, including Brick House, Limewood, and John Anthony.

Activism
Wood has been involved in Environmentalism. In 2019, he was named a member of the United Nations Environment Programme's climate change awareness campaign, Mountain Heroes. He also sits on several conservationist boards including the Hong Kong Shark Foundation. He is currently an athlete and brand ambassador for the apparel company, Arc'teryx.

Personal life
Wood is married to Sandra Wood and has two children.

References 

Year of birth missing (living people)
Living people